The Lockheed F-94 Starfire was the first United States Air Force jet-powered day/night all-weather interceptor. It was also the first operational USAF fighter equipped with an afterburner.  Introduced in February 1950, its primary user was the Air Defense Command.  It also saw service in the Korean War, replacing the F-82G Twin Mustang used by Far East Air Force in 1952.  The aircraft had a relatively short operational life, being retired by the active-duty Air Force in November 1957 and the Air National Guard by June 1959.

Squadrons

United States Air Force

Air National Guard

References

External links

Fighter squadrons of the United States Air Force
United States Air National Guard
Military units and formations of the United States Air Force by equipment